Recovery is the second studio album by American rapper Quando Rondo. It is expected to be released on March 25, 2023, through Atlantic Records, Never Broke Again, and Quando Rondo LLC. It features production from Quando's go-to producer CxbGoCrazy, alongside Bankroll Got It, Geo Vocals, lvl35dav, and SephGotTheWaves. It features a single guest appearance from YoungBoy Never Broke Again.

Singles
"Give Me a Sign" with YoungBoy Never Broke Again, the album's lead single dedicated to the death of Quando's close friend Lul Pab, was released on August 30, 2022. The album's second single, "Speeding", was released on January 22, 2023. "Long Live Pabb", the album's third single dedicated to the death of Lul Pab was released just a day later on January 23, 2023. "Me First", the album's fourth single was released on February 15, 2023. The album's final single, "Tear It Down", was released on March 9, 2023, prior to the album's official announcement.

Track listing

Personnel
Credits adapted from Tidal.

 Quando Rondo – vocals (all songs)
 YoungBoy Never Broke Again – vocals (20)

 Joseph E. Colmenero – mastering, mixing (1-19)
 Fabian Marasciullo – mixing (6, 8)
 CxbGoCrazy – engineering (1-20), mastering, mixing (16, 20)
 Jason "Cheese" Goldberg – engineering, mastering, mixing (20)
 David Devaney – mixing assistant (20)

References

2023 albums
Quando Rondo albums
Atlantic Records albums